Robert Mureşan, born 22 March 1991 in Arad, Romania, is a Romanian Grand Prix motorcycle road racer. He races in the Romanian Superbike Championship aboard a BMW S1000RR.

Early years
 2001: national champion on juniors III class
 2002: national runner-up on juniors II class
 2003: national champion on 125cmc class
 2004: national runner-up on 125cc GP and Balkan champion on 125cmc GP
 2005: 3rd place on Central Europe Championship and 5th in the Austrian Championship, both on general

Moto GP
He competed in 125GP class for three years (2006, 2007 & 2008).

Supersport
He made his debut in the 600cc class of Supersport World Championship in 2009.

In 2011, Robert Mureşan will ride for the Romanian team Performance Technical Racing Romania alongside the Romanian Cătălin Cazacu in the 600cc class of  Supersport World Championship.

Career statistics

By season

Races by year

References

External links
 
 Profile at motogp.com

1991 births
Living people
Romanian motorcycle racers
125cc World Championship riders
Supersport World Championship riders
FIM Superstock 1000 Cup riders
Sportspeople from Arad, Romania